Siah Koleh (also Romanized as Sīāh Koleh) is a village in Bibalan Rural District, Kelachay District, Rudsar County, Gilan Province, Iran. At the 2006 census, its population was 145, in 39 families.

References 

Populated places in Rudsar County